The New Vision Party (NVP) is a political party in Ghana. It was formed in 2008. The founder is Prophet Daniel Nkansah of the New Vision Pentecostal Church in Accra, Ghana. The party's colours are mauve, white and gold. Daniel Nkansah was nominated as the party's candidate for the Ghanaian presidential election, 2008. The party is perceived by some to have a religious affiliation though this is denied by its leadership who insist that there are people with various religious backgrounds in the leadership.

References

2008 establishments in Ghana
Political parties established in 2008
Political parties in Ghana